Dolls Run is a stream in the U.S. state of West Virginia.

Dolls Run was named after Rudolph "Doll" Snider, a pioneer settler.

See also
List of rivers of West Virginia

References

Rivers of Monongalia County, West Virginia
Rivers of West Virginia